Spy Games: Elevator Mission is a first person shooter by Japanese studio Dreams Co. Ltd., where the player tries to go through a 50-story building. Along the way, the player must recover 5 hidden data disks for each level.

The building data are randomly generated.

Reception

IGN editor Lucas M. Thomas rated it 2.5 (terrible), citing it has poor control, repetitive, bad visual and sound, and 'plays out like an N64 shooter that you shouldn't have had to pay for at all.'

References

External links
UFO Interactive Games page
IGN review

2007 video games
First-person shooters
North America-exclusive video games
Single-player video games
Spy video games
UFO Interactive Games games
Video games developed in Japan
Wii games
Wii-only games